Aviation in North Dakota takes place around the state's 89 public airfields, including 8 commercial airports.  Notable North Dakota aviators include Carl Ben Eielson, Bruce Peterson, and James Buchli.

North Dakota's first aeronautical event was the flight of a Wright Model B on July 19, 1910, at the Grand Forks Air Meet flown by Wright Exhibition Team member Archibald Hoxsey.

Events 

 June 9, 1911, a Curtiss Biplane named "Sweetheart" flew at the Fargo Fairgrounds before an audience of 12,000 spectators piloted by Robert "Lucky Bob" St. Henry
 July 12, 1911 Thomas McGoey flies the first North Dakota designed and built aircraft, the Kenworthy-McGoey flying machine at Grand Forks.
 July 1916 Bismarck, North Dakota, has its first flight.
 1928 North Dakota native Carl Ben Eielson, along with Hubert Wilkins become the first men to fly across the Arctic Ocean.
 1990 Three crew members of a Northwest Airlines flight are sentenced to jail for flying while drunk from Fargo to Minneapolis.

Aerospace Industry

Aircraft Manufacturers
 Cirrus Aircraft, Grand Forks, North Dakota
 1911-1911 Kenworthy-McGoey Aviation Company. Founded to produce and demonstrate aircraft.
 The Boughton Flying Machine Corporation lost its prototype in 1916.

Components
Northrop Grumman, New Town, North Dakota 
Goodrich Corporation, Jamestown, North Dakota
Ideal Aerosmith, Grand Forks, North Dakota
Appareo Systems, Fargo, North Dakota

Flight Schools 
 The John D. Odegard School of Aerospace Sciences at the University of North Dakota is one of the largest civilian flight training operations in the country.

Airports 
 List of airports in North Dakota

Commercial Service 
 Bismarck Municipal Airport
 Hector International Airport, Fargo
 Grand Forks International Airport
 Williston Basin International Airport
 Dickinson Theodore Roosevelt Regional Airport
 Minot International Airport
 Devils Lake Regional Airport
 Jamestown Regional Airport

People
 James Buchli, born in Fargo, flew aboard four Space Shuttle missions.

Organizations 
 The North Dakota Aviation Council comprises six organizations promoting aviation in North Dakota.

Government and Military
All flight operations in North Dakota are conducted within FAA oversight.
The North Dakota Air National Guard was activated on 16 January 1947 with the formation of the 178th Fighter squadron, 178th utility flight, 178th weather station, and detachment B of the 233rd Air service group.

Museums 
 Bonanzaville, USA Eagles hangar features a range of aircraft.
  The Dakota Territory Air Museum in Minot was founded in 1986.
  The Fargo Air Museum in Fargo, features flying examples of World War II aircraft.

Gallery

Notes

References 

 
Transportation in North Dakota